The 2008 Pan American Women's Junior Handball Championship took place in the sports complex CeNARD, in Buenos Aires from March 11 – March 15.

Teams

Bronze medal match

Gold medal match

Final standing

2008 in handball
 Sports competitions in Buenos Aires
Pan American Women's Junior Handball Championship
H
2008 in Argentine sport